The Ordre du Mérite civil  (Order of Civil Merit) of France was created on 14 October 1957 to reward individuals who have rendered services reported to the state as part of the Ministry of Interior, or to departments, municipalities and public institutions. The order is managed by the Interior minister, assisted by a Council of the Order. 

The Order was deprecated by decree on 3 December 1963, and superseded by the Ordre national du Mérite. Extant members may continue to display their decorations.

Classes
The Order has three classes:
Commandeur (Commander)
Officier (Officer)
Chevalier (Knight)

References

 

Civil Merit
Civil Merit
Awards established in 1957
1957 establishments in France
1963 disestablishments in France
Orders of merit